State Medical Rescue (PRM) in Poland is a system of free public emergency healthcare established by Ustawa o Państwowym Ratownictwie Medycznym (State Medical Rescue Act), including ambulance service and Emergency Departments (EDs).  While in Polish public hospitals and clinics NFZ common public insurance is required, PRM medical services in ambulances and EDs are completely free for everyone. Since 2018 emergency ambulances that operates in PRM, that is Polish 112 and 999 emergency numbers, are operated by public entities only (mostly voivodeships and cities dependent organisations).

Standards

Operating system

At the moment, the operating system of Polish EMS is similar of the Austrian- Franco-German-Spanish delivery model, and is physician-led and an Integrated EMS of Public Health (IEMS). Physicians (usually anaesthetists) respond to most emergency calls, and a great deal of definitive care and even simple physician consultation and discharge occur at the scene. These physicians are often referred to as Emergency Physicians. Emergency medicine has been recognized as a medical specialty since 1999. Due to shortage of specialists in emergency medicine, selected other medical specialists (anesthesiology and intensive care, internal diseases, general surgery, pediatrics, pediatric surgery, orthopaedics and traumatology) are allowed to work in the system until 2020. Unlike the German system, the physicians do not respond in separate vehicles, instead staffing the appropriate types of ambulances directly.  Transportation to a hospital may, or may not, be an outcome depending on the decision of the MICU Physician. The variation occurs in that the physician may be supported by either paramedics or nurses, or some mix of the two roles.  Each ambulance also has a dedicated Ambulance Technician who drives, with minimal medical training.  As the system evolves, however, it will be changing.  Paramedic-led ambulances will respond to most emergency calls, as in the Anglo-American model, with physicians being "sent" only to those calls where there is a potential critical threat to life.

Vehicles and equipment
Poland has voluntarily adopted the majority of the specifications for ambulances of European Standard CEN 1789. Ambulances and equipment used do comply with the technical standards outlined.  While design and technical standards are voluntarily complied with, there is virtually no compliance with the visual identity standards described in the Standard.  There are also no immediate plans to do so.  While plans are in place for the restructuring of some aspects of the EMS system, these are mostly related to staffing configurations and deployment, which are not covered by the technical Standard.  It appears unlikely that the proposed changes will have any effect on Standard compliance.

Training
Since 2006, the evolving legal standard of training for Polish paramedics is a three-year bachelor's degree.  As an option, those with substantial prior experience may proceed to a degree, following two years of additional study.  This program is available in a number of Polish universities, and will completely replace the prior training standard, which consisted of an assortment of short courses.  Short courses of various types continue to be offered, but these are now essentially the typical short courses found elsewhere in EMS, including Advanced Cardiac Life Support and Pediatric Advanced Life Support, among others.

System configuration

Ratownictwo Medyczne service delivery units 
Państwowe Ratownictwo Medyczne (EMS stations)
Lotnicze Pogotowie Ratunkowe (LPR) (Air ambulance stations)
Fire Brigade - In the Polish system firefighters provide a level of tiered response to assist Polish EMS in exceptional circumstances, including fires and motor vehicle accidents.  The training provided to Polish firefighters is limited to first aid and what might be described as ABC (medicine).  As a result, their participation in emergency medical responses is less common than what those in North America would be accustomed to.

Vehicles

Land ambulance
The vehicles of the Polish EMS system come in a wide variety of shapes and sizes. As a member of the European Union, Poland has decided to ratify most aspects of the requirements of European standard CEN 1789 for ambulances, as reflected in the Polish EN 1789 (Classes A-C) Standard.  The visual identity requirements of the European standard for ambulances are not yet being followed.
The three major types of vehicle are:
The patient transport ambulance (T), which is smaller, conforms to European Class A, and contains fewer staff and less equipment.
The ambulans specjalistyczny (S) (English: specialised ambulance),  is a larger van used for serious emergencies. This unit type is the first choice for response to emergencies that appear to be immediately life-threatening. The crew of this type is minimum two paramedics (or emergency nurses) and a physician. While some CEN 1789 Class B vehicles are still present in the system, the objective is to ultimately ensure that this type of ambulance is always a Class C.
The ambulans podstawowy (P)  (English: basic ambulance), is a van-type ambulance used for less severe emergencies. The crew of a basic ambulance is minimum two paramedics (or emergency nurses). It is currently the most common type. These vehicles conform to the CEN 1789 Class B standard, although often Class C ambulances are seen in this role.

In addition, the system also operates specialty ambulances which are equipped for and dedicated to neonatal transport (Type N), which are not used for any other purpose.

Air ambulance
Polish Lotnicze Pogotowie Ratunkowe (LPR) operates helicopter air ambulances strategically located in cities throughout Poland.  In addition, fixed wing aircraft (Piaggio P180 Avanti) stationed in Warsaw are used for longer range transport. Beginning in the summer of 2011, LPR exclusively operated EC-135.

LPR operated a single AgustaWestland AW109 from 2005 to 2009 when the aircraft was lost (without loss of life) in a training accident and subsequently written off.

High Mountain Rescue (Tatry, TOPR) uses the Polish-built PZL W-3 Sokół, while common Mountains Rescue (GOPR) cooperates with Lotnicze Pogotowie Ratunkowe (LPR) for patients transport.

Equipment 

The basic required equipment of the Type S and Type P ambulances (former Type R and Type W ambulances) is as follows.  This equipment is obligatory and represents minimal requirements:

 Basic First Aid kit.
 Dressings and Bandages
 Spinal immobilization equipment such as Cervical collars or spine boards
 Mobile medical ventilator
 Basic diagnostic equipment, such as blood-pressure cuffs
 Portable defibrillator
 ECG monitor
 Equipment for intravenous therapy
 Gurney and blankets
 Flexible stretcher, also called a Reeves stretcher
 Rigid or collapsible transport chair (called a stair chair in the United States)
 Rescue equipment

Communications
All ambulances in Poland are dispatched from centralized regional dispatch centers (Polish: Centrum Powiadamiania Ratunkowego)(CPR).  The traditional standardized emergency telephone number for ambulances in Poland in the POTS telephone system is 999.  The standard European emergency number, 112, also works in Poland, including mobile systems, and is gradually replacing 999.  Calls are then triaged by interview process, and the closest and most correct type of ambulance resource is sent to the call.

E112 is a location-enhanced version of 112. The telecom operator transmits the location information to the emergency centre. The EU Directive E112 (2003) requires mobile phone networks to provide emergency services with whatever information they have about the location a mobile call was made. This directive is based on the American Federal Communications Commission's Enhanced 911 ruling in 2001.

System changes

Previous systems
In Poland, there were two types of emergency ambulances, type R (now S), and type W (P), which are staffed as follows:
Ambulance type R - 3 people including a physician, paramedic a driver-paramedic.
Ambulance type W - 3  including a physician 1 paramedic, and a driver-paramedic. Or 2 people Nurses/paramedics and driver-paramedic.

Current system
The government of Poland has mandated significant changes within the EMS system.  These will include more paramedic-led ambulances and less physician-led ambulances.  In the proposed system Polish paramedics will perform ALS skills without a physician present.  These changes are proposed to occur in 2010, with the acquisition of some 600 new ambulances by the Polish government; the result of industrial action by Polish paramedics. Patient transport ambulances (Type T) and neonatal transport ambulances (Type N) will remain in their current configurations.  The new types of ambulances and staffing patterns will be as follows:

The ambulans specjalistyczny (S) (English: specialist ambulance) is a larger van used for serious emergencies. This is used only for potentially life-threatening responses. Standard personnel staffing  consists of a doctor (with emergency medicine specialization), a paramedic (or specialized nurse), and a driver/orderly.  The vehicle used will be in all cases a CEN 1789 Class C ambulance. The new ambulance category, Type S  replaced the Type R ambulance in the "More ALS" category.
The ambulans podstawowy  (P) (English: basic ambulance; in EMS squads called also paramedic ambulance) is a standard van-type ambulance used  for emergency  responses when a Type S unit is unavailable, and for lower priority emergency calls.  Such vehicles will not be used for consultations, or for non-emergency transport.  Standard staffing of personnel will consist of a paramedics (or specialized nurses) and a driver-Paramedic orderly. The new category, Type P will replace the old  Type W vehicle configuration. Type P ambulances will conform to, at minimum, CEN 1789 Class B, with the option at a local level to use Class C vehicles instead.

Primary health care and non-emergency medical transport
In Poland, ambulances are also used for non-emergency transport, such as:
 Ambulance N - neonatal transport team - pediatric staff
 Ambulance OL - physician traveling team - 3 people including a physician, Nurse-EMT, and a driver-EMT
 Ambulance T - outgoing transport team, - 2 people including EMT-nurses, and a driver-EMT

References